Patrick Lucey McGeer  (June 29, 1927 – August 29, 2022) was a Canadian physician, professor and medical researcher. He was regarded as a leading authority on the causes and prevention of Alzheimer's disease and was the principal author of the inflammatory hypothesis of the disease, which holds that Alzheimer's is an inflammation of the cortex. He was also a Canadian basketball player who competed in the 1948 Summer Olympics, a politician who represented the constituency of Vancouver-Point Grey in the British Columbia legislature from 1962 to 1986, and a member of the British Columbia cabinet from 1976 to 1986. In 1995, he and his wife Edith were inducted as Officers of the Order of Canada. In 2002 they were jointly inducted as Fellows of the Royal Society of Canada, and in 2005 they were jointly inducted into the Order of British Columbia.

McGeer died at his home in Vancouver on August 29, 2022, at the age of 95.

Aurin Biotech
In August 2012, McGeer and his wife Edith founded Aurin Biotech Inc., following indications that the Aurintricarboxylic acid (ATA) complex inhibit activation of the Complement system. Since activation of the complement system is implicated in a number of diseases (see Complement system#Role in disease), these indications suggested that ATA could be an effective treatment for these diseases. Aurin was founded to explore the efficacy of using ATA and related compounds in the treatment of these diseases. The particular focus is on diseases that are caused or exacerbated by aberrant complement activation. Low molecular weight components of the aurintricarboxylic acid complex have been shown to be non-toxic and orally effective.

References

External links
 Canadian Olympic Assn. profile (olympic.ca)
 UBC Sports Hall of Fame Inductee page
 2005 Recipients: Doctors Patrick & Edith McGeer - Order of British Columbia
 

1927 births
2022 deaths
Basketball players at the 1948 Summer Olympics
Basketball people from British Columbia
British Columbia Liberal Party MLAs
British Columbia Social Credit Party MLAs
Canadian expatriates in the United States 
Canadian men's basketball players
Canadian neurologists
Canadian people of Irish descent
Canadian sportsperson-politicians
Canadian neuroscientists
Fellows of the Royal Society of Canada
Leaders of the British Columbia Liberal Party
Members of the Executive Council of British Columbia
Members of the Order of British Columbia
Officers of the Order of Canada
Olympic basketball players of Canada
Politicians from Vancouver
Princeton University alumni
Basketball players from Vancouver
UBC Thunderbirds basketball players
Academic staff of the University of British Columbia